The London Chartered Bank of Australia (from 1893 the London Bank of Australia) was an English-run Australian bank which operated from 1852 to 1921.

History 

It was formed in October 1852, with the issuing of a prospectus and granting of a Royal Charter for a new London-based joint stock bank to operate in the colonies of New South Wales and Victoria. The chairman was Duncan Dunbar, while the directors included numerous banking and business figures from England, Ireland and Australia. It was promoted as taking advantage of the economic boom associated with the Australian gold rushes. The appointment of serving New South Wales Auditor-General Francis Merewether as a director led to controversy in New South Wales.

A manager and clerk staff were sent from England to New South Wales on the Harbinger in May 1853. Branches in Collins Street, Melbourne and George Street, Sydney opened in July 1853, the latter occupying the former premises of the defunct Bank of Australia, with a Geelong branch following in October 1853. A succession of branches in regional mining centres followed in 1855-56, with Ballarat, Beechworth and Dunolly among them.

By 1893, the bank had main offices in Melbourne and Sydney, thirty-four branches in Victoria, five other city and suburban branches in Sydney, eight regional New South Wales branches (Bourke, Broken Hill, Deniliquin, Hay, Katoomba, Newcastle, Waverley and Wilcannia) and four branches in Queensland (Brisbane, Ipswich, Townsville and Charters Towers). 

The bank experienced a £300,000 bank run in April 1893 as part of the 1893 banking crisis, which caused it to abruptly close pending reconstruction on 26 April, despite the bank having generally been regarded as in a satisfactory position and having just announced a proposed dividend. A voluntary winding-up order was granted in London in mid-May while reconstruction discussions continued. The process of negotiating and approving a reconstruction scheme that would see a new institution, the London Bank of Australia, take over the assets, liabilities and operations of the bank, went on through June and July. It reopened under the new name and structure on 7 August in Australia and 8 August in London.

In August 1920, the bank announced that it had received a takeover proposal by the English, Scottish and Australian Bank seeking a controlling interest in the bank and that the directors had reached a provisional agreement for amalgamation into the ES&A Bank if sufficient shareholders were willing to sell. The ES&A Bank was successful in the takeover, and the London Bank ceased to exist when the ES&A Bank assumed control of its business from 2 May 1921.

Heritage buildings
Many of the bank's former branch buildings remain today, with several now heritage listed. They include:
 Beeac, Victoria
 Bourke Street, Melbourne
 Clunes, Victoria
 Dunolly, Victoria
 Fitzroy North, Victoria
 Geelong, Victoria
 Kerang, Victoria
 St Arnaud, Victoria
 Wangaratta, Victoria
 Bourke, New South Wales

References

1852 establishments in Australia
Australian companies established in 1852
Defunct banks of Australia
Banks established in 1852
Banks disestablished in 1921
1921 disestablishments in Australia
English-Australian culture
1920 mergers and acquisitions